The 1997 Toronto Argonauts season was the 108th season for the team since the franchise's inception in 1873. The team finished in first place in the East Division with a 15–3 record and qualified for the playoffs for the second consecutive year. The defending champion Argonauts defeated the Montreal Alouettes in the Eastern Final and qualified for the 85th Grey Cup to defend their title. Toronto defeated the Saskatchewan Roughriders by a score of 47–23, winning their 14th Grey Cup championship, and repeated as Grey Cup champions.

Offseason

CFL draft

Ottawa Rough Riders Dispersal Draft

Preseason

Regular season

Season standings

Regular season

Postseason

Grey Cup

Awards and records
Doug Flutie, Most Outstanding Player Award
Mike Kiselak, Outstanding Offensive Lineman Award 
Derrell Mitchell, Outstanding Rookie Award

1997 CFL All-Stars
QB – Doug Flutie
FB – Robert Drummond
SB – Derrell Mitchell
C – Mike Kiselak
DT – Rob Waldrop
DB – Johnnie Harris
DS – Lester Smith
P/K – Mike Vanderjagt
ST – Mike "Pinball" Clemons
WR -{ Terrance Lawrence}

References

Toronto Argonauts seasons
James S. Dixon Trophy championship seasons
Grey Cup championship seasons